Noud van Melis (10 February 1924 – 8 August 2001) was a Dutch footballer, who played as a centre forward.

Club career
Van Melis was born in Eindhoven and started playing football at local third-level club RKVV Tongelre. In 1946, he moved to EVV Eindhoven. Over time, a team was built around the proficient goalscorer Van Melis. During the early 1950s, this team was among the best in the Netherlands, culminating in the 1953–54 season, in which they became national champions.

After the 1953–54 season, professional football was introduced in the Netherlands, and Van Melis took the opportunity to get paid by moving to Rapid JC. In the 1955–56 season, he was an important part of the Rapid JC squad which became Dutch champions.

In 1958, he returned to EVV Eindhoven, who by then had descended to the Eerste Divisie. After two seasons, he retired at the age of 36.

A stand at the Jan Louwers Stadion, home stadium of FC Eindhoven (as EVV Eindhoven is now known), is named after him.

International career
Van Melis earned 13 caps for the Netherlands between 1950 and 1957. He scored in each of his first eight international appearances, netting twelve goals. In total, he scored 15 times. In 1952, he was selected for the Dutch squad at the Summer Olympics, but did not make an appearance.

Style of play
Van Melis was known as a very productive goalscorer who was adept at positioning. Despite being positioned on the pitch as a traditional centre forward, he also possessed qualities associated with more modern forwards, due to his pace, technique, and insight.

Career statistics

International
(Source)

International goals
Scores and results list Netherlands' goal tally first.

Honours
EVV Eindhoven
Netherlands Football League Championship: 1953–54
Rapid JC
Netherlands Football League Championship: 1955–56

References

External links

1924 births
2001 deaths
Footballers from Eindhoven
Association football forwards
Dutch footballers
Netherlands international footballers
Olympic footballers of the Netherlands
Footballers at the 1952 Summer Olympics
Eredivisie players
Eerste Divisie players
Roda JC Kerkrade players